Muñeca rota, is a Mexican telenovela produced by Guillermo Diazayas for Televisa in 1978. It is based on the life of Marilyn Monroe.

Cast 
Dulce as Norma
Jorge Ortiz de Pinedo
Norma Herrera as Gladys
Bertha Moss + 
Ruben Rojo +
Erika Carrasco
Beatriz Sheridan +
Enrique Pontón + 
Graciela Doring +
Angélica Vale

References

External links 

Mexican telenovelas
1978 telenovelas
Televisa telenovelas
Spanish-language telenovelas
1978 Mexican television series debuts